Pareuxoa perdita is a moth of the family Noctuidae. It is found in the Magallanes and Antartica Chilena Region of Chile.

The wingspan is about 32 mm. Adults are on wing from November to January.

External links
 Noctuinae of Chile

Noctuinae
Endemic fauna of Chile